In analytic number theory, a Dirichlet series, or Dirichlet generating function (DGF), of a sequence is a common way of understanding and summing arithmetic functions in a meaningful way. A little known, or at least often forgotten about, way of expressing formulas for arithmetic functions and their summatory functions is to perform an integral transform that inverts the operation of forming the DGF of a sequence. This inversion is analogous to performing an inverse Z-transform to the generating function of a sequence to express formulas for the series coefficients of a given ordinary generating function. 

For now, we will use this page as a compendia of "oddities" and oft-forgotten facts about transforming and inverting Dirichlet series, DGFs, and relating the inversion of a DGF of a sequence to the sequence's summatory function. We also use the notation for coefficient extraction usually applied to formal generating functions in some complex variable, by denoting  for any positive integer , whenever 

 

denotes the DGF (or Dirichlet series) of f which is taken to be absolutely convergent whenever the real part of s is greater than the abscissa of absolute convergence, .

The relation of the Mellin transformation of the summatory function of a sequence to the DGF of a sequence provides us with a way of expressing arithmetic functions  such that , and the corresponding Dirichlet inverse functions, by inversion formulas involving the summatory function, defined by 

 

It is often also convenient to express formulas for the summatory functions over the Dirichlet inverse function of f using this construction of a Mellin inversion type problem.

Preliminaries: Notation, conventions and known results on DGFs

DGFs for Dirichlet inverse functions

Recall that an arithmetic function is Dirichlet invertible, or has an inverse  with respect to Dirichlet convolution such that , or equivalently , if and only if . The positive real  associated with each invertible arithmetic function f is called the abscissa of convergence. 

We also see the following identities related to the Dirichlet inverse of some function g that does not vanish at one:

Summatory functions

Using the same convention in expressing the result of Perron's formula, we assume that the summatory function of a (Dirichlet invertible) arithmetic function , is defined for all real  according to the formula

 

We know the following relation between the Mellin transform of the summatory function of f and the DGF of f whenever : 

 

Some examples of this relation include the following identities involving the Mertens function, or summatory function of the Moebius function, the prime zeta function and the prime-counting function, and the Riemann prime-counting function:

Statements of the integral formula for Dirichlet inversion

Classical integral formula

For any s such that , we have that 

If we write the DGF of f according to the Mellin transform formula of the summatory function of f, then the stated integral formula simply corresponds to a special case of Perron's formula.

Direct proof: from Apostol's book

 Define the Dirichlet series  and its associated partial sums .
 Define the function .
 Use partial summation to write .
 Express the error term in the approximation as an integral of a certain function  over the interval .
 Use Abel's summation formula to express  as a sum of integrals involving  and its derivatives.
 Substitute the results from steps 4, 5, and 7 into the formula from step 3, and simplify to obtain the classical integral formula for Dirichlet inversion.

This proof shows that the function  can be recovered from its associated Dirichlet series by means of an integral, which is known as the classical integral formula for Dirichlet inversion.

Special cases of the formula

If we are interested in expressing formulas for the Dirichlet inverse of f, denoted by  whenever , we write . Then we have by absolute convergence of the DGF for any  that 

Now we can call on integration by parts to see that if we denote by  denotes the  antiderivative of F, for any fixed non-negative integers , we have 

Thus we obtain that 

We also can relate the iterated integrals for the  antiderivatives of F by a finite sum of k single integrals of power-scaled versions of F: 

 

In light of this expansion, we can then write the partially limiting T-truncated Dirichlet series inversion integrals at hand in the form of

Statements in the language of Mellin transformations

 The Dirichlet generating function of a sequence  is the Mellin transform of the sequence, evaluated at : .
 The Dirichlet inverse of a sequence  is related to the inverse Mellin transform of its generating function: , where  is a real number greater than the abscissa of convergence of the Dirichlet series .

A formal generating-function-like convolution lemma

Suppose that we wish to treat the integrand integral formula for Dirichlet coefficient inversion in powers of  where , and then proceed as if we were evaluating a traditional integral on the real line. Then we have that 

 

We require the result given by the following formula, which is proved rigorously by an application of integration by parts, for any non-negative integer :

 

So the respective real and imaginary parts of our arithmetic function coefficients f at positive integers x satisfy: 

The last identities suggest an application of the Hadamard product formula for generating functions. In particular, we can work out the following identities which express the real and imaginary parts of our function f at x in the following forms: 

 

Notice that in the special case where the arithmetic function f is strictly real-valued, we expect that the inner terms in the previous limit formula are always zero (i.e., for any T).

See also 

 Dirichlet series 
 Dirichlet convolution
 Dirichlet inverse 
 Arithmetic function
 Multiplicative function
 Dirichlet generating function (DGF)

Notes

References

Number theory
Analytic number theory
Integer sequences